The Amagasaki Serial Murder Incident was a 2012 several serial murder and body dumping case, in which family households in Japan were tortured continuously for more than 25 years. The crimes began with the disappearance of a woman in or around 1987. At least 8 victims were confirmed to have died, mainly as a result of assault, confinement and other forms of abuse. The crimes were committed mainly in Amagasaki, but also in six other prefectures, Hyogo, Kochi, Kagawa, Okayama, Shiga and Kyoto.

The incident was discovered when the suspects Miyoko Sumida and Masanori Sumida were arrested in November 2011. The cousin of the ringleader received a life sentence over the Amagasaki murders.

Aftermath
On the 12th of December 2012, Miyoko Sumida committed suicide in a holding cell, whilst on suicide watch.

References

See also 
 Futoshi Matsunaga - main culprit of a similar case, Kitakyushu Serial Murder Incident (北九州連続殺人事件)

Amagasaki
Murder in Japan
Serial murders in Japan
Torture in Japan